Salisbury House in Bury Street West, Edmonton, London, is a grade II* listed building with Historic England.

Gallery

References 

Edmonton, London
Grade II* listed houses in London
Grade II* listed buildings in the London Borough of Enfield